Mount Holmes  is a buttress-type mountain, standing  northwest of Mount Hayes on the east coast of Graham Land, Antarctica. It was charted in 1947 by the Falkland Islands Dependencies Survey (FIDS), and photographed from the air by the Ronne Antarctic Research Expedition (RARE) under Finn Ronne. The mountain was named by the FIDS for Maurice Holmes, author of An Introduction to the Bibliography of Captain James Cook R.N. (London, 1936).

References 

Holmes, Mount